Chandra Kanta Chaudhary is a Nepalese Politician. He was serving as the Member Of House Of Representatives (Nepal) elected from Saptari-3, Province No. 3. He is member of Rastriya Janata Party Nepal. He was defeated as Mayoral candidate in local elections of Nepal.

References

Living people
Rastriya Janata Party Nepal politicians
Nepal MPs 2017–2022
Loktantrik Samajwadi Party, Nepal politicians
People's Socialist Party, Nepal politicians
1947 births